Matthew Thomas Ramsey (born October 21, 1977) is an American country music singer and songwriter who is the lead vocalist and rhythm guitarist of his band Old Dominion, with several hit songs on country radio to his credit.

Early life
Ramsey grew up in Buchanan, Virginia, where he attended James River High School. He learned to play the drums at a young age before picking up the guitar at age 14. He received a degree in Illustration from Virginia Commonwealth University.

Career
Ramsey moved to Nashville in 2000 to pursue a career in songwriting, where he met Trevor Rosen and the two became members of the group Old Dominion. Ramsey has written several hit songs including The Band Perry's "Chainsaw", Craig Morgan's "Wake Up Lovin' You", Dierks Bentley's "Say You Do", Kenny Chesney's "Save It for a Rainy Day", as well as songs by Sam Hunt and Luke Bryan. The band released its debut studio album, Meat and Candy, which included the number one singles "Break Up with Him" and "Song for Another Time", and top five single "Snapback", on November 6, 2015. The band has released three more albums, Happy Endings, their self-titled album, and Time, Tequila & Therapy in 2017, 2019, and 2021, respectively.

Songs written by Ramsey

References 

People from Buchanan, Virginia
Virginia Commonwealth University alumni
Living people
Singer-songwriters from Virginia
1977 births
21st-century American singers